Ada is a town and municipality located in the North Banat District of the autonomous province of Vojvodina, Serbia. It is situated near the river Tisa in the geographical region of Bačka. The town has a population of 9,564, while the municipality has 16,991 inhabitants (2011 census), and a 75.04% Hungarian majority.

The municipality of Ada municipality includes the towns of Ada (the seat) and nearby Mol, and the villages of Utrine, Obornjača and Sterijino.

Demographics

According to the 2011 census, the total population of the Ada municipality was 16,991 inhabitants.

Ethnic groups
All local communities in the municipality have a Hungarian majority.

The ethnic composition of the municipality is:

Jewish history

A Jewish community was founded in the city in 1790. Over the years, pogroms, assaults and murders against them against the background of anti-Semitism were carried out.

The first rabbi of the city was Rabbi Aharon Ackerman, followed by Rabbi Yaakov Heilbronn, who was murdered by rioters.
In 1880, 410 Jews lived in the community and in 1896 a synagogue was established. In 1925, 470 Jews lived in the town.

In April 1941, Nazi Germany invaded the area and 60 Jews were murdered. Most of the community's Jews were later murdered in the Holocaust.
59 survivors immigrated to Israel in 1948 and in 1973 the synagogue was demolished by order of the Hungarian authorities.

Economy
The following table gives a preview of total number of registered people employed in legal entities per their core activity (as of 2018):

Notable people

 Mátyás Rákosi (1892–1971), Hungarian communist leader
 Arpad Sterbik (born 1979), Yugoslav and Spanish handball goalkeeper

International relations

Twin towns — Sister cities
Ada is twinned with:
 Újbuda, Hungary
 Makó, Hungary
 Inárcs, Hungary
 Nemesnádudvar, Hungary
 Joseni, Romania

See also
List of places in Serbia
List of cities, towns and villages in Vojvodina
List of Hungarian communities in Vojvodina

References
  Taksony (Hungary)

External links
 Official website
 History of Ada 

 
Places in Bačka
Populated places in North Banat District
Municipalities and cities of Vojvodina
Hungarian communities in Serbia
Towns in Serbia